Hell Valley or Valley of Hell may refer to:

 Höllental (Black Forest), a deep valley in the state of Baden-Württemberg, Germany
 Hell Valley Railway, a line that runs through the valley
 Höllental (Franconian Forest), a protected nature reserve in Bavaria, Germany
 Höllental (Lower Austria), a valley in the Alps along the River Schwarza
 Höllental (Wetterstein), a mountain path up the Zugspitze on the German-Austrian border
 Val d'Enfer, a valley in Provence, France
 The Valley of Hell (film), a 1927 American Western
 Thermal Valley, Taiwan

See also
 Heil Valley, Victoria Land, Antarctica
 Hill Valley (disambiguation)